Manpreet Singh Ayali (born 6 January 1975) is an Indian politician and leader of Shiromani Akali Dal in Punjab Legislative Assembly, and is currently Member of the Legislative Assembly of the Dakha Assembly constituency.

Early life
Ayali was born on 6 January 1975 to father Gurcharanjit Singh, a politician and agriculturalist. His father has served as Sarpanch of his village for 15 years. Ayali dropped out of college after completing Class 12. In 1998, he became president of agriculture society of his village and later served as sarpanch. In 2007, he became chairperson of Ludhiana Zila Parishad.

Political career

MLA, first term (2012-2017)
He was first MLA from 2012 to 2017 for Shiromani Akali Dal.  In 2014, Ayali contested for MP for the Ludhiana Lok Sabha Seat but lost in third place to Ravneet Singh Bittu. 
Ayali served as the Chairman of Zila Parishad Ludhiana from 2007 to 2013 and in 2013 he received the award for the Best Zila Parishad Chairman in the country in presence of the Prime Minister of India.

MLA, second term (2019-2022)
In 2017, Ayali lost the seat to H. S. Phoolka by 4,169 votes. He took the seat again in 2019 after the resignation of Phoolka and subsequent by-election, defeating Sandeep Sandhu.

MLA, third term (2022-present)
Ayali won from Dakha Assembly constituency for a third time in 2022. SAD only had three successful candidates in the Punjab Assembly. The Aam Aadmi Party gained a strong 79% majority in the sixteenth Punjab Legislative Assembly by winning 92 out of 117 seats in the 2022 Punjab Legislative Assembly election. MP Bhagwant Mann was sworn in as Chief Minister on 16 March 2022.

For the 2022 Indian presidential election, SAD decided to support the NDA candidate, despite SAD no longer being part of NDA. Ayali abstained from voting in the election.

Electoral performance

References 

1975 births
Living people
Indian Sikhs
National Democratic Alliance candidates in the 2014 Indian general election
People from Punjab, India
Shiromani Akali Dal politicians
People from Ludhiana district
Punjab, India district councillors
Punjab, India MLAs 2012–2017
Punjab, India MLAs 2022–2027